Sedin-e Yek (also Romanized as Sedīn-e Yek; also known as Sedeyen-e Yek, Sedeyyen-e Bālā, Sedeyyen-e Yek, Seyyedīn-e Bālā, and Seyyedīn-e Yek) is a village in Veys Rural District, Veys District, Bavi County, Khuzestan Province, Iran. At the 2006 census, its population was 620, in 103 families.

References 

Populated places in Bavi County